"We on Fire" is the lead single from The Hot Boys' album Guerrilla Warfare. The songs are in the form of continued questions starting with "What kind of nigga..." (In the edited version, it's "What kind of boy...").  

The music video for the second version of this song shows Juvenile, B.G., Lil Wayne, Turk and Birdman on the run from law enforcement after committing robbery.

Charts

External links
 "Ain't No Limit" Music Video

1999 songs
Hot Boys songs
Songs written by Lil Wayne
Song recordings produced by Mannie Fresh
Cash Money Records singles
Gangsta rap songs
Songs written by Juvenile (rapper)